The swamp wallaby (Wallabia bicolor) is a small macropod marsupial of eastern Australia. This wallaby is also commonly known as the black wallaby, with other names including black-tailed wallaby, fern wallaby, black pademelon, stinker (in Queensland), and black stinker (in New South Wales) on account of its characteristic swampy odour.

The swamp wallaby is the only living member of the genus Wallabia.

Etymology
Historic names for the swamp wallaby include Aroe kangaroo and Macropus ualabatus, as well as banggarai in the Dharawal language.

Habitat and distribution
The swamp wallaby is found from the northernmost areas of Cape York Peninsula in Queensland, down the entire east coast and around to southwestern Victoria. It was formerly found throughout southeastern South Australia, but is now rare or absent from that region.

It inhabits thick undergrowth in forests and woodlands, or shelters during the day in thick grass or ferns, emerging at night to feed. Brigalow scrub in Queensland is a particularly favoured habitat.

Description
The species name bicolor comes from the distinct colouring variation, with the typical grey coat of the macropods varied with a dark brown to black region on the back, and light yellow to rufous orange on the chest. A light coloured cheek stripe is usually present, and extremities of the body generally show a darker colouring, except for the tip of the tail, which is often white.

The gait differs from other wallabies, with the swamp wallaby carrying its head low and its tail out straight.

The tail in both sexes is approximately equal in length to the rest of the body.

The swamp wallaby has seven carpal bones in the wrist (humans have eight).

Reproduction
The swamp wallaby becomes reproductively fertile between 15 and 18 months of age, and can breed throughout the year. Gestation is from 33 to 38 days, leading to a single young. The young is carried in the pouch for 8 to 9 months, but will continue to suckle until about 15 months.

The swamp wallaby exhibits an unusual form of embryonic diapause, differing from other marsupials in having its gestation period longer than its oestrous cycle. This timing makes it possible for swamp wallaby females to overlap two pregnancies, gestating both an embryo and a fetus at the same time. The swamp wallaby ovulates, mates, conceives and forms a new embryo one to two days before the birth of their full-term fetus. Consequently, females are continuously pregnant throughout their reproductive life.

The swamp wallaby is notable for having a distinct sex-chromosome system from most other Theria (the subclass that includes marsupials and placental mammals). Females are characterized by the XX pair typical of therians, but males have one X chromosome and two non-sequence homology Y chromosomes. This system is thought to arise from a series of chromosomal fusions over the last 6 million years.

Nutrition
The swamp wallaby is typically a solitary animal, but often aggregates into groups when feeding. It will eat a wide range of food plants, depending on availability, including shrubs, pasture, agricultural crops, and native and exotic vegetation. It appears to be able to tolerate a variety of plants poisonous to many other animals, including brackens, hemlock and lantana.

The ideal diet appears to involve browsing on shrubs and bushes, rather than grazing on grasses. This is unusual in wallabies and other macropods, which typically prefer grazing. Tooth structure reflects this preference for browsing, with the shape of the molars differing from other wallabies. The fourth premolar is retained through life, and is shaped for cutting through coarse plant material.

There is evidence that the swamp wallaby is an opportunist taking advantage of food sources when they become available, such as fungi, bark and algae. There is also one reported case of the consumption of carrion.

Taxonomy

Several physical and behavioral characteristics make the swamp wallaby different enough from other wallabies that it is placed apart in its own genus, Wallabia. However, genetic evidence (e.g. Dodt et al, 2017) demonstrates that Wallabia is embedded within the large genus Macropus, necessitating reclassification of this species in the future.

Threats 
Anthropogenic actions, such as the increase in roads through swamp wallaby habitats, are a threat to their survival. They are frequently seen near the side of roads, leading to a larger number becoming roadkill.

Other sources of threat for the swamp wallaby are their predators, which include dingoes, eagles and wild dogs.

References

External links

Australian Museum
https://drive.google.com/?tab=mo&authuser=0#folders/0B0SZrEEV2Y42REFfSWdXcUtndVU

Macropods
Marsupials of Australia
Mammals of South Australia
Mammals of New South Wales
Mammals of Queensland
Mammals of Victoria (Australia)
Least concern biota of Australia
Mammals described in 1804